Singing Bones is the sixth studio album released by The Handsome Family. It was released in 2003 by Carrot Top Records (North America) / Loose Music (Europe). It includes a cover of the folk song "Dry Bones," known from Bascom Lamar Lunsford's 1928 version on Harry Smith's Anthology of American Folk Music. In 2014, the album received a resurgence of interest when the song "Far from Any Road" was used as the theme song for the first season of HBO's crime drama True Detective.

Reception
The album was well received by critics: according to Metacritic, the album has received an average review score of 85/100, based on 8 reviews, indicating "universal acclaim."

"Far from Any Road"
Besides its appearance in True Detective, "Far from Any Road" was also used as an opening song for Guns N' Roses''' 2014 world tour, and during the ending credits of the 2015 The Simpsons episode "Cue Detective."

"Far from Any Road" also charted on SNEP, the official French singles chart, in 2015, reaching number 61.

It was covered on the Andrew Bird album Things Are Really Great Here, Sort Of…''.

Track listing
 "The Forgotten Lake" – 3:46
 "Gail with the Golden Hair" – 3:16
 "24-Hour Store" – 4:52
 "The Bottomless Hole" – 3:16
 "Far from Any Road" – 2:48
 "If the World Should End in Fire" – 1:09
 "A Shadow Underneath" – 3:44
 "Dry Bones" – 3:16
 "Fallen Peaches" – 2:59
 "Whitehaven" – 2:46
 "Sleepy" – 3:08
 "The Song of a Hundred Toads" – 2:28
 "If the World Should End in Ice" – 1:08

References

External links
The Handsome Family official website

2003 albums
The Handsome Family albums
Carrot Top Records albums
Loose Music albums